Didier Éric Tapé (born 25 October 1981) is a French–Côte d'Ivoire basketball player who currently plays with Stade Rodez Aveyron in France.

He is a longtime member of the Côte d'Ivoire national basketball team and helped the team to a surprise silver medal at the 2009 African Championship.  Tape averaged 10.4 points per game in the tournament, including a team-leading 15 points in a semifinal victory against Cameroon that sent the team to its first FIBA World Championship since 1986.

References

1981 births
Living people
Ivorian men's basketball players
French men's basketball players
Ivorian expatriates in France
2010 FIBA World Championship players